The 2022 NJ/NY Gotham FC season was the team's thirteenth season as a professional women's soccer team and their tenth season as a member of the National Women's Soccer League, the top division of women's soccer in the United States.

Background

Ownership changes
After retiring as a player for Gotham FC, Carli Lloyd joined the ownership group on April 27, 2022. On May 4, 2022, NBA player Kevin Durant and investor Rich Kleiman announced their minority investment into Gotham FC via their investment company Thirty Five Ventures. On July 29, 2022, WNBA player Sue Bird joined Gotham FC's ownership group as a minority owner, consultant, and advisor. On August 10, 2022, Gotham FC announced the addition of former New York Giants quarterback Eli Manning and Giants chief commercial officer Pete Guelli to its ownership group as minority owners. The investments raised the club's valuation to an estimated $40 million.

Coaching changes
On August 11, 2022, Gotham FC fired head coach Scott Parkinson following a  start to the 2021 season and announced an immediate search for a new coach to be hired for the 2023 season. On August 13, 2022, the club named former Jamaica women's national football team coach Hue Menzies as interim head coach.

Management changes
On August 17, 2022, Gotham FC named Nathán Goldberg Crenier as its new assistant general manager, replacing Stephanie Lee, who left to become the NWSL's director of player affairs.

Team

First-team roster

Staff

Competitions

Challenge Cup

Standings

Matches

Regular season

Matches

League table

Results summary

Results by matchday

Squad statistics

Goalscorers

Cleansheets

Transfers

NWSL Expansion Draft

The 2022 NWSL Expansion Draft was an expansion draft held by the NWSL on December 16, 2021, for two expansion teams, Angel City FC and San Diego Wave FC, to select players from existing teams in the league.

On December 4, Gotham FC traded goalkeeper Kailen Sheridan in exchange for allocation money and roster protection from San Diego Wave FC. On December 8, Gotham FC traded goalkeeper DiDi Haračić in exchange for allocation money and roster protection from Angel City FC.

NWSL Draft

Transfers in

Transfers out

Loans out

New contracts

References

External links
 

Sky Blue FC
Sky Blue FC
NJ/NY Gotham FC seasons
Sky Blue FC